Dendrobium erosum is a species of orchid of the genus Dendrobium. It is found in Southern Thailand, Malaysia, Sumatra, Java, Sulawesi, Papua and New Guinea, Vanuatu, and the Solomon Islands. It grows to a maximum size of 2.5 mm.

References

erosum
Orchids of Asia
Orchids of Oceania
Flora of Peninsular Malaysia
Flora of the Solomon Islands (archipelago)
Flora of Sulawesi
Flora of Vanuatu
Orchids of Java
Orchids of Malaysia
Orchids of New Guinea
Orchids of Papua New Guinea
Orchids of Sumatra
Orchids of Thailand
Plants described in 1830
Taxa named by Carl Ludwig Blume